The Venucia R30 is a supermini or subcompact five-door hatchback produced by the Chinese auto maker Venucia, a subsidiary of Dongfeng Motor Co., Ltd.

Overview

The pre-production of the Venucia R30 debuted during the 2014 Beijing Auto Show, and is based on the Nissan March that is manufactured in China by the Dongfeng-Nissan joint venture. The market launch for the production Venucia R30 was launched on the Chinese car market in July 2014 with prices starting from 39,900 yuan to 49,900 yuan.

Dongfeng Skio ER30

The Dongfeng Skio ER30 is an electric subcompact five-door crossover produced by Dongfeng under the Dongfeng Skio sub-brand.

References

External links

Venucia website

R30
Hatchbacks
Cars of China
Subcompact cars
Front-wheel-drive vehicles
2010s cars
Cars introduced in 2014